Ella Littwitz (born 1982) is an Israeli artist, living and working in Jaffa, Israel. Littwitz graduated with BFA from Bezalel Academy of Art and Design in 2009.

Exhibitions

Solo 
 2012: Sirius, Tivon gallery, Israel, curated by Taly Cohen-Garbuz
 2014: The Most Promising Artist Award Exhibition, Fresh paint 7, Tel aviv, Israel, curated by Matan Daube
 2015: Monolith, Galeria silvestre, Tarragona, Spain
 2015: Hedgehogs see everything in yellow, Galeria silvestre, Madrid, Spain
 2019: The Promise, Kunst Halle Sankt Gallen, St. Gallen, Switzerland

Group 
 2011: 12th Istanbul Biennial, Turkey. Curated by Adriano Pedrosa & Jens Hoffmann
 2012: Cabinets of Wonder in Contemporary Art – From Astonishment to Disenchantment, Herzliya Museum of Contemporary Art, Israel | curated by D. Levin, G. Limon, D. Kaufmann
 2014: Back to Berlin, Re-view, [Herzliya Museum of Contemporary Art, Israel| curated by Dr. Aya Lurie, Tal Bechler, Ghila Limon

Awards and residences 
 2008–2010: Sharett Scholarship Program, America – Israel Cultural Foundation, Israel.
 2009: Mitchell Presser Excellence award granted by Bezalel Academy of Art and Design, Jerusalem, Israel.
 2009: Excellence scholarship granted by Rea Ben David, Photography House, Tel Aviv, Israel.
 2010: HomeBase V, Berlin, Germany.
 2012: Arbeitsstipendium Stiftung Kunstfonds, Bonn, Germany.
 2012–2013: The Botín Foundation grant, Santander, Spain 
 2013: The Igal Ahouvi Art Collection Promising Artist Award. Israel

References

External links 
Ella Littwitz
Ella Littwitz's page at Harlan Levey Projects

1982 births
Living people
Israeli artists
Israeli women artists
Bezalel Academy of Arts and Design alumni